Harveypatti is a panchayat town in Madurai district in the Indian state of Tamil Nadu.

Demographics
 India census, Harveypatti had a population of 8135. Males constitute 50% of the population and females 50%. Harveypatti has an average literacy rate of 83%, higher than the national average of 59.5%: male literacy is 87%, and female literacy is 79%. In Harveypatti, 10% of the population is under 6 years of age.

Politics
It is a part of the Madurai (Lok Sabha constituency). S. Venkatesan also known as  Su. Venkatesan from CPI(M) is the Member of Parliament, Lok Sabha, after his election in the 2019 Indian general election.

References

Cities and towns in Madurai district